Hansagymnasium Köln is a Gymnasium in Cologne, Germany and has about 800 pupils.

The school was founded in 1899 as a business school. Until 1941 its name was Oberrealschule am Hansaring.

Notable former pupils and staff

Pupils 
 Norbert Burger (1932 - 2012) - Mayor of Cologne 1980 - 1999
 Henryk M. Broder (born 1946) - author and journalist
 Hans Wilhelm Schlegel (born 1951) - astronaut
 Tillmann Otto (born 1974) - musician

Staff 
 Martin Brand (born 1975) - visual artist
 Kurt Holl (born 1938) - civil rights activist
 Henner Huhle (born 1937) - gymnast

Headmasters 
 1897–1899 Prof. Dr. Otto Wilhelm Thomé
 1899–1903 Dr. Johannes Vogels
 1903–1922 Dr. Konrad Cüppers
 1923–1931 Dr. Paul Holzapfel
 1931–1933 Wilhelm Steinforth
 1935–1945 Dr. Johannes Becker (provisionally since 1934)
 1961-1974 Adolf Kagel
 1975-1992 Dr. Gisbert Gemein
 1992–2002 Eckhard Wieberneit 
 2003–2012 Horst Kahl
 2012-2015 Norbert Subroweit
 2015-2016 Ulrike Thiede (provisionally)
 2016-2017 Niels Menge (provisionally)
 since 2017 Erika Nausester-Hahn

References

External links 

 official website

Schools in Cologne
Educational institutions established in 1899
Education in Germany
1899 establishments in Germany